Gagra Range is a mountain range of the Greater Caucasus in Abkhazia, Georgia.The range runs between the valleys of the Bzyb and Psou rivers to the south of the Caucasus Major, in a general North-South direction. The highest elevation is 3,357 m (Mount Agepsta).

The Gagra Range approaches the Black Sea close to the city of Gagra and plays an important role in moderating the climate of that resort by blocking cold, continental winds from the north and east.

The range is mostly made up of limestone, with pronounced karst topography and is characterized by many deep canyons created by rivers. The deepest cave in the world, the Veryovkina Cave, is located in the Arabika Massif of the Gagra Range.

A highway to Lake Ritsa runs by the range, along the Bzyb, Iupshara and Gega rivers.

See also 
Bzyb Range
Kodori Range
Achibakh Mountain

Notes

References 

Mountain ranges of Georgia (country)
Mountain ranges of the Caucasus
Mountain ranges of Abkhazia